The Hasanvand (also spelled Hasanavand and Hasanwand) are a Lur Laki-speaking tribe mainly settled in the Lorestan province of Iran. According to a 2008 census from the Statistical Center of Iran, the Hasanvand had 1,121 households in their summer pasture in Lorestan.

References

Sources 
 
 

Luri tribes
Lorestan Province